This article provides an overview of marital rape laws by country.

Introduction 

Marital rape is illegal in many countries. Throughout history until the 1970s, most states granted a husband the right to have sex with his wife whenever he so desired, as part of the marriage contract. However, in the 20th century and especially since the 1970s, women's rights groups initiated the anti-rape movement, demanding that they be given sexual autonomy over their own bodies, including within marriage. These rights have increasingly been recognised, and consequently marital rape has been criminalised by about 150 countries as of 2019. In some cases, marital rape is explicitly criminalised, in other cases the law makes no distinction between rape by one's husband or rape by anyone else. In a few countries, marital rape was criminalised due to a court decision. In some countries, the prevailing logic goes that there is no such thing as 'marital rape', since the verb 'to rape' (Latin: rapere) originally meant 'to steal' or 'to seize and carry off' (although its meaning shifted during the Middle Ages to 'violently abducting a woman for the purpose of forced coitus'), and it is impossible to steal something you already 'own', and a husband 'owns' his wife in marriage. However, in a few of those countries that do not criminalise marital rape, such as Malaysia, a husband can still be punished if he uses violence in order to have sex with his wife.

A

B

C

D

E

F

G

H

I

J

K

L

M

N

O

P

Q

R

S

T

U

V

Y

Z

References

Sources

Relevant legislation

laws
Law by country